Lenin (Lenine, Lenino) is a commune in the Rîbnița District of Transnistria, Moldova. It is composed of four villages: Lenin, Pervomaisc, Pobeda and Stanislavca. It has since 1990 been administered as a part of the self-proclaimed Pridnestrovian Moldavian Republic (PMR).

References

Communes of Transnistria
Rîbnița District